Wiederhold is a surname. Notable people with the surname include:

 Carlos Wiederhold (1867–1935), German-Chilean entrepreneur
 Doug Wiederhold (born  1986), actor
 Gio Wiederhold (born 1936), Italian computer scientist 
 Sascha Wiederhold (1904–1962), German painter, graphic artist and stage designer 

Surnames of German origin